This is a list of administrators and governors of Osun State. 
Osun State was formed on 27 August 1991 when it was split from Oyo State.

See also
States of Nigeria
List of state governors of Nigeria

References

Osun
Governors